Henry Francis Carpenter (28 December 1925 – 20 March 2001) was a British boxer. He competed in the men's flyweight event at the 1948 Summer Olympics.

Carpenter won the 1948 Amateur Boxing Association British flyweight title, when boxing out of the Bradfield ABC.

References

External links
 

1925 births
2001 deaths
British male boxers
Olympic boxers of Great Britain
Boxers at the 1948 Summer Olympics
Boxers from Greater London
Flyweight boxers